David Farrell (24 December 1905 – 21 June 1974) was an  Australian rules footballer who played with North Melbourne in the Victorian Football League (VFL).

Notes

External links 

1905 births
1974 deaths
Australian rules footballers from Victoria (Australia)
North Melbourne Football Club players